Auleutes epilobii is a species of minute seed weevil in the beetle family Curculionidae. It is found in North America.

References

Further reading

External links

 
 

Curculionidae
Beetles described in 1800
Beetles of North America